{{DISPLAYTITLE:C6H8O6}}
The molecular formula C6H8O6 (molar mass: 176.124 g/mol) may be:

 Ascorbic acid (vitamin C)
 Erythorbic acid
 Glucuronolactone
 Propane-1,2,3-tricarboxylic acid
 Triformin